The Binghamton University Explorchestra (commonly known as "Explorchestra" or "Explo"), is a composers' orchestra based in Binghamton University in Binghamton, New York. The ensemble performs exclusively original music.

Founded in 2009 by James Mayr, Maxim Pekarsky, and Manar Alherech (then-second-year students (sophomores) at Binghamton), Explorchestra has premiered over 200 works by university and guest composers. The ensemble is dedicated to promoting new music in all genres by composers from both traditional and diverse backgrounds. Explorchestra consistently performs contemporary classical music, original film music, and videogame music, as well as new works in jazz, symphonic rock, folk music, concert band repertoire, and many other styles.

All members of Explorchestra have the opportunity to submit and, if they choose to, conduct new works. Due to its inherent diversity, the orchestra offers its members opportunity to learn the many facets of a modern orchestra from conducting, arrangement, and audio production to arts management, fundraising, and marketing.

An increasingly important member of the Broome County arts community, Explorchestra partnered with the Binghamton Philharmonic Orchestra to offer its first Composers' Competition in 2011. The orchestra frequently collaborates with local businesses and campus organizations, supporting arts, sports, and fashion shows, and such charity fundraisers as St. Baldrick's Foundation, Amnesty International, 2011 Binghamton Area floods, and Jump Nation.

Explorchestra is currently run by 8 elected executive board members: 

President: Zachary Sloan

Vice President: Olivia Vataj

Treasurer: Jarek He

Music Librarian: Emma Zablonski

Public Relations Head: Jessica Swift

Music Technology Specialist: Meisi Williams

A/V Specialist: Adam Abbey

Historian: Caitlin Smith

References

Binghamton University